In transcendental number theory, the Lindemann–Weierstrass theorem is a result that is very useful in establishing the transcendence of numbers. It states the following:  

The theorem is named for Ferdinand von Lindemann and Karl Weierstrass. Lindemann proved in 1882 that  is transcendental for every non-zero algebraic number  thereby establishing that  is transcendental (see below). Weierstrass proved the above more general statement in 1885.

The theorem, along with the Gelfond–Schneider theorem, is extended by Baker's theorem, and all of these would be further generalized by Schanuel's conjecture.

Naming convention
The theorem is also known variously as the Hermite–Lindemann theorem and the Hermite–Lindemann–Weierstrass theorem. Charles Hermite first proved the simpler theorem where the  exponents are required to be rational integers and linear independence is only assured over the rational integers, a result sometimes referred to as Hermite's theorem. Although apparently a rather special case of the above theorem, the general result can be reduced to this simpler case.  Lindemann was the first to allow algebraic numbers into Hermite's work in 1882.  Shortly afterwards Weierstrass obtained the full result, and further simplifications have been made by several mathematicians, most notably by David Hilbert and Paul Gordan.

Suppose  is a non-zero algebraic number; then  is a linearly independent set over the rationals, and therefore by the first formulation of the theorem  is an algebraically independent set; or in other words  is transcendental. In particular,  is transcendental. (A more elementary proof that  is transcendental is outlined in the article on transcendental numbers.)

Alternatively, by the second formulation of the theorem, if  is a non-zero algebraic number, then  is a set of distinct algebraic numbers, and so the set  is linearly independent over the algebraic numbers and in particular  cannot be algebraic and so it is transcendental.

To prove that  is transcendental, we prove that it is not algebraic. If  were algebraic, i would be algebraic as well, and then by the Lindemann–Weierstrass theorem  (see Euler's identity) would be transcendental, a contradiction. Therefore  is not algebraic, which means that it is transcendental.

A slight variant on the same proof will show that if  is a non-zero algebraic number then  and their hyperbolic counterparts are also transcendental.

-adic conjecture

Modular conjecture
An analogue of the theorem involving the modular function  was conjectured by Daniel Bertrand in 1997, and remains an open problem. Writing  for the square of the nome and  the conjecture is as follows.

Lindemann–Weierstrass theorem

Proof
The proof relies on two preliminary lemmas. Notice that Lemma B itself is already sufficient to deduce the original statement of Lindemann–Weierstrass theorem.

Preliminary lemmas

Proof of Lemma A. To simplify the notation set:
 

Then the statement becomes

Let  be a prime number and define the following polynomials:

 

where  is a non-zero integer such that  are all algebraic integers. Define

 

Using integration by parts we arrive at

 

This also holds for s complex (in this case the integral has to be intended as a contour integral, for example along the straight segment from 0 to s) because

Consider the following sum:

In the last line we assumed that the conclusion of the Lemma is false. In order to complete the proof we need to reach a contradiction. We will do so by estimating  in two different ways.

This is not divisible by p when p is large enough because otherwise, putting

(which is a non-zero algebraic integer) and calling  the product of its conjugates (which is still non-zero), we would get that p divides , which is false.

So  is a non-zero algebraic integer divisible by (p − 1)!. Now

where  is a polynomial (with integer coefficients) independent of i. The same holds for the derivatives .

Hence, by the fundamental theorem of symmetric polynomials,

Therefore

However one clearly has:

where  is the polynomial whose coefficients are the absolute values of those of fi (this follows directly from the definition of ). Thus

and so by the construction of the 's we have  for a sufficiently large C independent of p, which contradicts the previous inequality. This proves Lemma A. ∎

Proof of Lemma B: Assuming

we will derive a contradiction, thus proving Lemma B.

Let us choose a polynomial with integer coefficients which vanishes on all the 's and let  be all its distinct roots. Let b(n + 1) = ... = b(N) = 0.

The polynomial

Since the product is symmetric, for any  the monomials  and  have the same coefficient in the expansion of P.

Thus, expanding  accordingly and grouping the terms with the same exponent, we see that the resulting exponents  form a complete set of conjugates and, if two terms have conjugate exponents, they are multiplied by the same coefficient.

So we are in the situation of Lemma A. To reach a contradiction it suffices to see that at least one of the coefficients is non-zero. This is seen by equipping  with the lexicographic order and by choosing for each factor in the product the term with non-zero coefficient which has maximum exponent according to this ordering: the product of these terms has non-zero coefficient in the expansion and does not get simplified by any other term. This proves Lemma B. ∎

Final step
We turn now to prove the theorem: Let a(1), ..., a(n) be non-zero algebraic numbers, and α(1), ..., α(n) distinct algebraic numbers. Then let us assume that:

 

We will show that this leads to contradiction and thus prove the theorem. The proof is very similar to that of Lemma B, except that this time the choices are made over the a(i)'s:

For every i ∈ {1, ..., n}, a(i) is algebraic, so it is a root of an irreducible polynomial with integer coefficients of degree d(i). Let us denote the distinct roots of this polynomial a(i)1, ..., a(i)d(i), with a(i)1 = a(i).

Let S be the functions σ which choose one element from each of the sequences (1, ..., d(1)), (1, ..., d(2)), ..., (1, ..., d(n)), so that for every 1 ≤ i ≤ n, σ(i) is an integer between 1 and d(i). We form the polynomial in the variables 

 

Therefore Q is a polynomial with integer coefficients in elementary symmetric polynomials of the above variables, for every i, and in the variables yi.

The evaluated polynomial  vanishes because one of the choices is just σ(i) = 1 for all i, for which the corresponding factor vanishes according to our assumption above. Thus, the evaluated polynomial is a sum of the form

 

where we already grouped the terms with the same exponent. So in the left-hand side we have distinct values β(1), ..., β(N), each of which is still algebraic (being a sum of algebraic numbers) and coefficients .

By multiplying the equation with an appropriate integer factor, we get an identical equation except that now b(1), ..., b(N) are all integers. Therefore, according to Lemma B, the equality cannot hold, and we are led to a contradiction which completes the proof. ∎

Note that Lemma A is sufficient to prove that e is irrational, since otherwise we may write e = p / q, where both p and q are non-zero integers, but by Lemma A we would have qe − p ≠ 0, which is a contradiction. Lemma A also suffices to prove that  is irrational, since otherwise we may write  = k / n, where both k and n are integers) and then ±i are the roots of n2x2 + k2 = 0; thus 2 − 1 − 1 = 2e0 + ei + e−i ≠ 0; but this is false.

Similarly, Lemma B is sufficient to prove that e is transcendental, since Lemma B says that if a0, ..., an are integers not all of which are zero, then

 

Lemma B also suffices to prove that  is transcendental, since otherwise we would have 1 + ei ≠ 0.

Equivalence of the two statements

Baker's formulation of the theorem clearly implies the first formulation.

is a polynomial with rational coefficients, then we have

and since  are algebraic numbers which are linearly independent over the rationals, the numbers  are algebraic and they are distinct for distinct n-tuples . So from Baker's formulation of the theorem we get  for all n-tuples .

Now assume that the first formulation of the theorem holds. For  Baker's formulation is trivial, so let us assume that , and let  be non-zero algebraic numbers, and  distinct algebraic numbers such that:

As seen in the previous section, and with the same notation used there, the value of the polynomial

at

has an expression of the form

 

where we have grouped the exponentials having the same exponent.

By multiplying the relation

See also
 Gelfond–Schneider theorem
 Baker's theorem; an extension of Gelfond–Schneider theorem
 Schanuel's conjecture; if proven, it would imply both the Gelfond–Schneider theorem and the Lindemann–Weierstrass theorem

Notes

References

Further reading

External links

Articles containing proofs
E (mathematical constant)
Exponentials
Pi
Theorems in number theory
Transcendental numbers